The James W. Dalton Highway, usually referred to as the Dalton Highway (and signed as Alaska Route 11), is a  road in Alaska. It begins at the Elliott Highway, north of Fairbanks, and ends at Deadhorse (an unincorporated community within the CDP of Prudhoe Bay) near the Arctic Ocean and the Prudhoe Bay Oil Fields. Once called the North Slope Haul Road (a name by which it is still sometimes known), it was built as a supply road to support the Trans-Alaska Pipeline System in 1974.  It is named after James Dalton, a lifelong Alaskan and an engineer who supervised construction of the Distant Early Warning Line in Alaska and, as an expert in Arctic engineering, served as a consultant in early oil exploration in northern Alaska. It is also the subject of the second episode of America's Toughest Jobs and the first episode of the BBC's World's Most Dangerous Roads.

History
In 1966, Governor Walter J. Hickel opened the North Slope to oil extraction. To improve access to the oil fields, a 400-mile winter road was planned between Livengood and Prudhoe Bay. Construction started in November 1968, and the "Walter J. Hickel Highway" was completed by March 1969. Due to poor engineering, the construction of the road exposed the underlying permafrost to thawing, and the road was abandoned by April of that year. Maintenance was not performed as the route was farther west than the planned Trans-Alaska Pipeline System.

Following the failure of the Hickel Highway, oil companies still needed a route to the North Slope. The Alyeska Pipeline Service Company funded what would be the first stretch of the Dalton Highway from Livengood to the Yukon River in 1969. 

Delays to the construction of the Trans-Alaska Pipeline System, and therefore the road, meant that work on it did not resume until April 29, 1974. Within 5 months, 390 miles of the road were built and construction was finished. The pipeline would not be completed until 1977. It was initially known as the "Wales Highway".

In 1979, Alyeska turned over control of the road to the state of Alaska, who gave it the official name of "James W. Dalton Highway". In 1981, the highway was opened to the public up to Disaster Creek at mile 211. In 1994, the public was allowed access to the entire length of the highway.

Route description
The highway, which directly parallels the pipeline, is one of the most isolated roads in the United States. There are only three towns along the route: Coldfoot (pop 34) at Mile 175, Wiseman (pop 12) at Mile 188, and Deadhorse (25 permanent residents, 3,500–5,000 or more seasonal residents depending on oil production) at the end of the highway at Mile 414.  Fuel is available at the E. L. Patton Yukon River Bridge (Mile 56), as well as Coldfoot and Deadhorse. Two other settlements, Prospect Creek and Galbraith Lake, are uninhabited except for campers and other short-term residents.

The road itself is mostly gravel, very primitive in places, and small vehicle and motorcycle traffic carries significant risk.  The nearest medical facilities are in Fairbanks and Deadhorse.  Anyone embarking on a journey on the Dalton is encouraged to bring survival gear.

Despite its remoteness, the Dalton Highway carries a good amount of truck traffic through to Prudhoe Bay: about 160 trucks daily in the summer months and 250 trucks daily in the winter. The highway comes to within a few miles of the Arctic Ocean. Beyond the highway's terminus at Deadhorse are private roads owned by oil companies, which are restricted to authorized vehicles only.  There are, however, commercial tours that take people to the Arctic Ocean. All vehicles must take extreme precaution when driving on the road, and drive with headlights on at all times.  There are quite a few steep grades (up to 12%) along the route, as well.

As of July 2013,  of the highway are paved, in several sections, between the following mileages: 19 and 24; 37 and 50; 91 and 111; 113 and 197; 257 and 261; 344 and 352; and 356 and 361.

Truckers on the Dalton have given their own names to its various features, including: Taps, The Shelf, Franklin Bluffs, Oil Spill Hill, Beaver Slide, Surprise Rise, Sand Hill, Ice Cut, Gobbler's Knob, Finger Mountain, Oh Shit Corner, and the Roller Coaster. The road reaches its highest elevation as it crosses the Brooks Range at Atigun Pass, 4,739 feet (1,444 m).

The highway is the featured road on the third, fourth, fifth and sixth seasons of the History reality television series Ice Road Truckers, which aired May 31, 2009, to present. It is also the subject of the second episode of America's Toughest Jobs and the first episode of the BBC's World's Most Dangerous Roads featuring Charley Boorman and Sue Perkins. Polar bears are known to traverse the Arctic region of Alaska and can be seen wandering the outskirts of Deadhorse at the terminus of the Dalton Highway.

Floodings of the Sagavanirktok River, combined with melting of nearby ice roads under warmer climatic conditions have forced weeks-long closures of the road and the need for significant repairs, costing several million US dollars.

Major intersections and other features

Gallery

See also

 List of Alaska Routes
 Dempster Highway - Only other all-purpose road to go past the Arctic Circle in North America

References

External links

 BLM Alaska: Dalton Highway
 Bureau of Land Management 2011 Dalton Visitor Guide (24 pages)
 History Channel's "Ice Road Truckers" (Season Three)

State highways in Alaska
Transportation in North Slope Borough, Alaska
Transportation in Unorganized Borough, Alaska
Brooks Range
Roads within the Arctic Circle